The Mongaup River is a stream in the U.S. state of New York. It is a tributary to the Delaware River.

Etymology
The name 'Mongaup' is derived from an Indian language; probably meaning "dancing feather", or "huckeberry valley". Variant spellings include "Mangawping River", "Mingwing River", "Mon-gaw-ping River" and "Mongaap River".

Course
The Mongaup River originates as the East Mongaup River, between Harris and South Fallsburg. It officially takes on the name of Mongaup River after it goes under NY 17. Then, the river flows mostly southwest, with an occasional sharp curve, until it joins with the West Branch Mongaup River, where it then makes a sharp turn south, after it passes under NY 17B in Mongaup Valley, New York. About 3,100 feet from the bridge (952 meters), the river widens into the Swinging Bridge Reservoir. From there, it continues south as a small stream, until it flows under Forestburgh Road (County Route 43). Then, the river once again passes through a hydroelectric dam, and is reduced to a small stream again. After the dam, it travels east for a small segment, and then bends south again. After joining with Black Brook, it then continues further south as the Rio Reservoir, closely followed on the east side by Plank Road.

Hydroelectric power
The Mongaup River features three hydroelectric dams along its course, all owned by Eagle Creek Renewable Energy. The dams are located at the end of the Swinging Bridge, Mongaup Falls, and Rio Reservoirs. All three dams together produce about 60 million kilowatt hours of hydroelectric power, which goes to serve the citizens of New York.

Attractions 
The Mongaup River Valley features a handful of restaurants, hotels, and attractions, making it popular for tourists who are visiting the area. The river features multiple public boat launches on the Swinging Bridge and Rio Reservoirs; and there is a large marina on the Swinging Bridge Reservoir which offers a restaurant and boat rentals. The reservoir has also been stocked with fish by a local nature agency, which makes it a popular destination for fishermen and boaters. However, there are very high amounts of boat traffic in the summer months, which has caused some local homeowners to complain.

Further down the river, there is a whitewater rafting agency that offers guided Whitewater Rafting tours of the river. Overall, the entire region has seen significantly higher tourism rates, which may cause even more people to flock to these locations.

Crossings 
The Mongaup River is crossed several times, by a variety of roads and highways. Below is a complete listing, ordered from north to south.

See also 

 List of rivers of New York

References

Rivers of Orange County, New York
Rivers of Sullivan County, New York
Tributaries of the Delaware River